"Start Walking" is a song by Swedish singer Tove Styrke. It was released on 22 October 2021 through Sony Music as the lead single from her fourth studio album, Hard (2022).

Background
"Start Walking" was written by Tove Styrke, Pablo Bowman, Peter Rycroft, Caroline Ailin, and Sly. Styrke previously collaborated with Ailin on her third studio album Sway (2018). "Start Walking" was produced by Lostboy. The song was released as a single on 22 October 2021 through Sony Music.

Composition and lyrics
"Start Walking" is a pop song. Styrke described the song as a "disco banger". Regarding its lyrics, she deemed it an "upbeat song with sad lyrics". She said, "It's about a person who knows a relationship is over, and how it sucks to actually be the one to leave but you know there is no other way."

Reception
"Start Walking" debuted and peaked at number 79 on the Sverigetopplistan singles chart on 29 October 2021.

Music video
Oskar Gullstrand directed the accompanying music video for "Start Walking".

Track listing
Digital download
"Start Walking" – 3:14

Digital download
"Start Walking (acoustic version) – 3:24

Credits and personnel
Credits are adapted from Tidal.

Tove Styrke – songwriting
Pablo Bowman – songwriting
Peter Rycroft – songwriting
Caroline Ailin – songwriting
Sly – songwriting
Lostboy – production, keyboards, programming
Henrik Edenhed – mixing

Charts

References

External links

2021 songs
2021 singles
Tove Styrke songs
Songs written by Caroline Ailin
Songs written by Pablo Bowman
Songs written by Tove Styrke
Sony Music singles
Songs written by Peter Rycroft